Euarestopsis is a genus of tephritid  or fruit flies in the family Tephritidae.

Species
Euarestopsis paupera Hering, 1937

References

Tephritinae
Tephritidae genera
Diptera of South America